Simon Kuke (also written as Simon Kook) is a Thai actor, action choreographer, director, and producer.

Background
Kuke, whose Thai name is Sarut Khanwilai (formerly Suchat Khanwilai), was born in Kalasin province. He liked action films since childhood, especially martial arts films and the Shaw Brothers' wuxia films. His favorite actors included Bruce Lee, Jackie Chan, Jet Li, and legendary Thai action star Panna Rittikrai.

While he was a freshman at The Institute of Physical Education Mahasarakham, Tony Jaa, who was an upperclassman, would put on a stunt show for students to see. This impressed Kuke and served as his inspiration to become a stuntman.

He started in the film industry by persuading Panna Rittikrai to give him a role as stand-in for Tony Jaa in Tom-Yum-Goong (2005) and Ong Bak 2 (2008); in the meantime, he also acted in several films under Sahamongkol Film International such as The Bodyguard (2004), Scared (2005), Mercury Man (2006), The Bodyguard 2 (2007), Yamada: The Samurai of Ayothaya (2010), and the Malaysian film 8 Jam (2012).  He has worked in the film industry for over 15 years.

In 2011, Kuke featured in the low-budget comedy film The Microchip as a supporting actor. In 2015, he co-starred with Donnie Yen in the Hong Kong kung fu film Ip Man 3 as  "Suchart",  a Muay Thai assassin. In the film, he fights with Ip Man, played by Yen, in a small elevator and a narrow staircase.

In 2017, he starred in the Thai television series Last Legend on Channel 7 as "Nan Kam", the Northern fighter; this character plays an important role from the 12th episode until the end of the series.

Filmography

Film

Television

References

External links
 
  (alternate page)
 Official Facebook 

Living people
Simon Kuke
Simon Kuke
Simon Kuke
Simon Kuke
1981 births